Brian Alan Watts (born September 10, 1947) is a Canadian former professional ice hockey player who played four games in the National Hockey League with the Detroit Red Wings during the 1975–76 season.

Career statistics

Regular season and playoffs

External links
 

1947 births
Living people
Canadian expatriate ice hockey players in England
Canadian ice hockey left wingers
Detroit Red Wings draft picks
Detroit Red Wings players
Fort Worth Wings players
Hamilton Red Wings (OHA) players
Ice hockey people from Ontario
IF Björklöven players
London Lions (ice hockey) players
Michigan Tech Huskies men's ice hockey players
New Haven Nighthawks players
Port Huron Flags (IHL) players
Sportspeople from Haldimand County
Virginia Wings players